David Egorovich Dolidze ( – 1960) was a Georgian and Soviet mathematician, known from his work in the mathematical theory of fluid motion. In particular he rediscovered an important uniqueness theorem for the classical solutions to the Navier–Stokes equations for an incompressible fluid, previously proved by Emanuele Foà.

Life and academic career
Born on 2 February 1908 in the village of Buknari, He graduated from Tbilisi State University in 1928. From 1934 he started working in his Alma Mater, and one year later, in 1935, he also started doing research at the Mathematics Institute of the Georgian Academy of Science. In 1945 he earned both the Doktor Nauk degree and the title of professor.

Selected publications
.
.
.
. His "Works", published by the Tbilisi State University on the occasion of his 70th birthday.

See also
Euler equations
Fluid mechanics
Dario Graffi
Olga Ladyzhenskaya
James Serrin

Notes

References

. The "Mathematics in the USSR during its first forty years 1917–1957" is an opus in two volumes describing the developments of Soviet mathematics during the first forty years of its existence. This is the second volume, titled "Biobibliography" (evidently an acronym for biography and bibliography), containing a complete bibliography of works published by Soviet mathematicians during that time period, alphabetically ordered with respect to author's surname and including, when possible, brief but complete biographies of the authors.
.
.
.
. A commemorative booklet written by Jondo Sharikadze, former pupil of David Dolidze, and published by the Tbilisi University Press.

1908 births
Soviet mathematicians
Tbilisi State University alumni
20th-century mathematicians from Georgia (country)
Fluid dynamicists
Year of death missing
Academic staff of Tbilisi State University